Mikhail Shubin may refer to:
 Mikhail Shubin (mathematician) (1944–2020), professor at Northeastern University
 Mikhail Shubin (triathlete) (born 1988), Russian triathlete